The 2022 Asian Youth Beach Handball Championship will be 2nd edition of the championship to be held from 22 to 28 March 2022 at Tehran, Iran under the aegis of Asian Handball Federation (AHF). It will be first time in history that the championship will be organised by IR Iran Handball Federation. It also acts as a qualification tournament for the 2022 Youth Beach Handball World Championship, with the two teams in each gender from the championship directly qualifying for the event to be hosted by Greece. The participants should be born between 1 January, 2004 and 31 December, 2006.

On 19 February 2020, the AHF decided to postpone the championship due to COVID-19 pandemic. Previously, the championship was scheduled to take place firstly from 1 to 10 April 2020, then from 11 to 17 September 2020 and then from 15 to 22 February 2021 but was postponed all times due to COVID-19 outbreak.

Draw
The date and venue of the draw will be announced soon.

Men

Former Seeding
Teams were seeded according to the AHF COC regulations and rankings of the previous edition of the championship. Teams who had not participated in the previous edition were in Pot 4.

 Chinese Taipei, Hong Kong, Korea, Saudi Arabia, and Thailand withdrew from the championship before the draw.

Participating nations
 
 
  (Host)

Group table

Results

Final standings

References

External links

International handball competitions hosted by Iran
 Handball competitions in Asia
Asia
 Asian Handball Championships
Asian Youth Beach Handball Championship
Asian Youth Beach Handball Championship
Asian Youth Beach Handball Championship
Asian Youth Beach Handball
Handball competitions  in Iran
 Beach handball competitions
Asian Youth Beach Handball Championship